Group A of the 2002 Fed Cup Americas Zone Group I was one of two pools in the Americas Zone Group I of the 2002 Fed Cup. Four teams competed in a round robin competition, with the top teams coming first and second advancing to the play-offs, and the bottom team being relegated down to 2003 Group II.

Canada vs. Puerto Rico

Mexico vs. Bahamas

Canada vs. Bahamas

Mexico vs. Puerto Rico

Canada vs. Mexico

Bahamas vs. Puerto Rico

  failed to win any ties in the pool, and thus was relegated to Group II in 2003. They placed first in their pool of five, and thus immediately advanced back to Group I for 2004.

See also
Fed Cup structure

References

External links
 Fed Cup website

2002 Fed Cup Americas Zone